Șerban Cantacuzino, CBE (6 September 1928, in Paris – 22 February 2018 in London) was a Romanian architect and the founder and president of Pro Patrimonio foundation.

Cantacuzino was the son of architect, painter and essayist Prince George Matei Cantacuzino, of the noble Cantacuzino family. His grandmother descended from the Wallachian ruler Gheorghe Bibescu and his mother Sanda was the daughter of Barbu Dimitrie Știrbei, also of a family of Romanian aristocrats. Following his parents' separation and his mother settling in England with her children in 1939, Cantacuzino was educated at Winchester College and Magdalene College, Cambridge. He was elected a Fellow of the Royal Institute of British Architects and was the secretary of the Royal Fine Arts Commission for more than a decade.

He was made a Commander of the Most Excellent Order of the British Empire (CBE) in the 1988 New Year Honours.

Cantacuzino was survived by his widow, Anne, and their daughters Ilinca and Marina.

Selected publications
Modern houses of the world. Studio Vista, London, 1966.
Great modern architecture. Studio Vista, Dutton, 1966.
New uses for old buildings. Architectural Press, London, 1975. 
Wells Coates:A Monograph. Gordon Fraser, London, 1978. 
Saving old buildings. Architectural Press, London, 1980.

References 

1928 births
2018 deaths
Romanian architects
Commanders of the Order of the British Empire
Fellows of the Royal Institute of British Architects
People educated at Winchester College
Alumni of Magdalene College, Cambridge
Romanian people of Greek descent
Romanian expatriates in France
Romanian emigrants to the United Kingdom
Serban